The River Bogie, also known as the Water of Bogie, is a river in north-west Aberdeenshire in the north east of Scotland. It is noted for its brown trout fishing.

Starting with the confluence of the Craig and Corchinan burns  near the parish of Auchindoir and Kearn, the River Bogie flows northeast for about 11 miles through Strathbogie to Rhynie and Huntly, immediately after which it joins the River Deveron  of which it forms one of the two main tributaries.

During the 19th century, the Bogie provided the linen bleachfields of Huntly, then a major textile centre, with water. 'Bogieside', the area along the banks of the river, is often referred to in local literature and folksongs, such as Adieu tae Bogieside and Bogie's Bonnie Belle.

References
Notes

Sources
Gazetteer for Scotland page, accessed 29 December 2011

External links

Deveron, Bogie and Isla Rivers Charitable Trust, accessed 28 December 2011

Bogie
1Bogie